The 2008 African Judo Championships were the 29th edition of the African Judo Championships, and were held in Agadir, Morocco in May 2008.

Medal overview

Men

Women

Medals table

References

External links
 

A
African Judo Championships
African Judo Championships
African Judo Championships, 2008
African Judo Championships, 2008
Sport in Agadir
African Championships, 2008
African Judo Championships